Labyrinthite is a very rare mineral of the eudialyte group. When compared to other species in the group, its structure is extremely complex - with over 100 sites and about 800 cations and anions - hence its name, with its complexity expressed in its chemical formula . The formula is simplified as it does not show the presence of cyclic silicate groups. Complexity of the structure results in symmetry lowering (likely due to ordering of cations) from the typical centrosymmetrical group to R3 space group. Other eudialyte-group representatives with such symmetry lowering include aqualite, oneillite, raslakite, voronkovite. Labyrinthite is the second dual-nature (both zircono- and titanosilicate) representative of the group after dualite and third with essential titanium after dualite and alluaivite.

Occurrence and association
Labyrinthite was discovered in hyperagpaitic (ultra-alkaline) pegmatite at Mt. Nyorkpakhk, Khibiny massif, Kola Peninsula, Russia, where it represents a late-stage mineral. It coexists with aegirine, alkaline amphibole, lamprophyllite, lomonosovite, potassium feldspar, pectolite, sodalite, and villiaumite.

Notes on chemistry
Beside that given in the formula, other elements substituting the main ones in labyrinthite are manganese, fluorine, and cerium.

Notes on crystal structure
Labyrinthite is two-modular - its structure contains alluaivite-like and eudialyte-like module. The framework of labyrinthite is 24-layered. It also characterize in doubled c unit cell parameter.

References

Further reading
 Johnsen, O., Ferraris, G., Gault, R.A., Grice, D.G., Kampf, A.R., and Pekov, I.V., 2003. The nomenclature of eudialyte-group minerals. The Canadian Mineralogist 41, 785-794

Cyclosilicates
Sodium minerals
Calcium minerals
Iron minerals
Zirconium minerals
Titanium minerals
Trigonal minerals
Minerals in space group 146